The 2nd Burma Infantry Brigade was an Infantry formation of the Burma Army during World War II. It was formed in July 1941. The Brigade was then disbanded in June 1942, and reformed in October 1942, to command battalions of the newly formed Burma Regiment. It was disbanded once again in November 1943. During this time it served with the 1st Burma Division July 1941 to January 1942, the 17th Indian Infantry Division January to March 1942. It then returned to 1st Burma Division.

Formation
These units served with the brigade.
2nd Battalion, Burma Rifles
4th Battalion, Burma Rifles	
6th Battalion, Burma Rifles
8th Battalion, Burma Rifles
Tenasserim Battalion, Burma Auxiliary Force	
1st Battalion, 7th Gurkha Rifles
4th Battalion, 12th Frontier Force Regiment
3rd Battalion, Burma Rifles
7th Battalion, Burma Rifles
7th Battalion, 10th Baluch Regiment
5th Battalion, 1st Punjab Regiment
3rd Battalion, Burma Regiment
4th Battalion, Burma Regiment
6th Battalion, Burma Regiment

See also

 List of Indian Army Brigades in World War II

References

Military units and formations of the British Empire in World War II
Military units and formations of Burma in World War II
Military units and formations established in 1939
Military units and formations disestablished in 1943